Bruchomyia is a genus of moth flies in the subfamily Bruchomyiinae.  Species have been recorded principally from South America.

Species
Bruchomyia almeidai Barretto & Andretta, 1946
Bruchomyia andina Quate, Pérez & Ogusuku, 2000
Bruchomyia argentina Alexander, 1921
Bruchomyia brasiliensis Alexander, 1940
Bruchomyia fusca Barretto, 1950
Bruchomyia mineira Bravo & Barata, 2012
Bruchomyia peruviana Alexander, 1929
Bruchomyia plaumanni Alexander, 1944
Bruchomyia shannoni Alexander, 1929
Bruchomyia unicolor Barretto, 1950

References

Nematocera genera
Diptera of South America
Taxa named by Charles Paul Alexander
Psychodidae